Q-Warrior is a wearable computer with a helmet-mounted display technology similar to, 3D HUD, that gives a soldier a picture of the entire battlefield.  The prototype was modelled on the Google Glass and built by BAE Systems in 2014.

References

Augmented reality
BAE Systems research and development
Display devices
Display technology
Eyewear
Products introduced in 2014
Wearable computers